Ceryx flava is a moth of the subfamily Arctiinae. It was described by George Thomas Bethune-Baker in 1911. It is found in Angola.

References

Endemic fauna of Angola
Ceryx (moth)
Moths described in 1911
Insects of Angola
Moths of Africa